The Eltro information rate changer was an analog recording tool used to modulate pitch without changing speed and vice versa. Patents for the device date back to the 1920s. The Eltro was the first technology capable of changing audio pitch (frequency) and speed (time) independently from one another.

The technology was developed in Germany by engineer Anton Marian Springer (1909-1964). The Eltro was an accessory device that worked in conjunction with a reel-to-reel tape recorder. Recorders compatible with the Eltro were introduced in the 1940s. The Eltro was first publicly demonstrated in 1953. By the mid 1960s it was a relatively common piece of equipment in many recording studios.

The Eltro was often used to adjust the timing of radio commercials to fit them into 30 second or 60 second segments. By using the Eltro a recording engineer could have greater control over the exact length of a commercial, while at the same time leaving pitch unaltered. It could also be used for a variety of musical effects. 

Most audio tape recorders use fixed heads, which remain stationary while the tape moves past. However, the Eltro used rotating heads. It does not record sound and is used for audio playback only. Rotating head technology was originally developed for analog videotape recording by Ampex in the 1950s. The altered sound from playback on the Eltro was then usually copied onto another reel-to-reel tape recorder.

Musician and recording engineer Wendy Carlos used an Eltro Mark II machine at Gotham Recording Studios in New York City in the 1960s. The Beach Boys used it to create high pitch vocal effects on the song She's Goin' Bald recorded in Los Angeles in 1967.

The Eltro is probably best known from use in the 1968 film 2001: A Space Odyssey. The effect of the Eltro was applied to the voice of actor Douglas Rain, playing the part of the HAL 9000 computer. In the film, both the pitch and speed of HAL's voice gradually drop at different rates while the computer is deactivated. The final effect was created by passing the actor's voice through the Eltro two times.

The Eltro worked with mono recordings and processed only one audio channel at a time. It fell out of common use during the 1970s. Later devices were developed to shift pitch by using a variety of electronic technologies. Many of these had stereo capability. With the widespread availability of digital recording in the 1980s it became possible to more easily control pitch and speed with software, while avoiding expensive and highly specialized analog equipment. Digital audio workstation software can now achieve the same effects more easily and at lower cost.

See also
 Audio time stretching and pitch scaling

References

Sound recording technology